In August 2018, the IUCN Red List of Threatened Species identified 6086 Vulnerable species, subspecies and varieties, stocks and sub-populations in the Animalia kingdom.

Annelida

Clitellata

Megadrilaceae

Megascolecidae

Moniligastridae

Opisthopora

Acanthodrilidae

Arthropoda

Arachnida

Amblypygi

Charinoidea

Phrynoidea

Araneae

Gnaphosidae

Linyphiidae

Lycosidae

Nephilidae

Ochyroceratidae

Oonopidae

Pholcidae

Pisauridae

Salticidae

Scytodidae

Tetragnathidae

Theraphosidae

Theridiidae

Theridiosomatidae

Opiliones

Phalangodidae

Podoctidae

Pseudoscorpiones

Neobisiidae

Olpiidae

Withiidae

Schizomida

Hubbardiidae

Scorpiones

Liochelidae

Branchiopoda

Anostraca

Branchinectidae

Chirocephalidae

Parartemiidae

Thamnocephalidae

Diplostraca

Chydoridae

Daphniidae

Leptestheriidae

Limnadiidae

Chilopoda

Scolopendromorpha

Scolopendridae

Diplopoda

Polydesmida

Haplodesmidae

Pyrgodesmidae

Polyzoniida

Siphonotidae

Siphonophorida

Siphonophoridae

Sphaerotheriida

Arthrosphaeridae

Spirobolida

Pachybolidae

Spirostreptida

Cambalopsidae

Spirostreptidae

Entognatha

Collembola

Entomobryidae

Isotomidae

Insecta

Archaeognatha

Machilidae

Coleoptera

Anthribidae

Carabidae

Cerambycidae

Cetoniidae

Cicindelidae

Cleridae

Curculionidae

Dytiscidae

Elateridae

Elmidae

Eucnemidae

Geotrupidae

Leiodidae

Lucanidae

Mycetophagidae

Scarabaeidae

Tenebrionidae

Tetratomidae

Trogositidae

Zopheridae

Diptera

Blephariceridae

Drosophilidae

Tabanidae

Grylloblattodea

Grylloblattidae

Hemiptera

Cixiidae

Hymenoptera

Apidae

Colletidae

Formicidae

Megachilidae

Melittidae

Lepidoptera

Crambidae

Hesperiidae

Lasiocampidae

Lycaenidae

Noctuidae

Nymphalidae

Papilionidae

Pieridae

Stathmopodidae

Mantodea

Mantidae

Odonata

Aeshnidae

Argiolestidae

Austropetaliidae

Calopterygidae

Chlorocyphidae

Chlorogomphidae

Coenagrionidae

Corduliidae

Euphaeidae

Gomphidae

Heteragrionidae

Hypolestidae

Isostictidae

Lestidae

Lestoideidae

Libellulidae

Macromiidae

Megapodagrionidae

Not Assigned

Pentaphlebiidae

Philogeniidae

Philosinidae

Platycnemididae

Platystictidae

Polythoridae

Synthemistidae

Thaumatoneuridae

Orthoptera

Acrididae

Eumastacidae

Gryllidae

Mogoplistidae

Pamphagidae

Pneumoridae

Rhaphidophoridae

Stenopelmatidae

Tetrigidae

Tettigoniidae

Trigonidiidae

Phasmatodea

Diapheromeridae

Phasmatidae

Plecoptera

Eustheniidae

Gripopterygidae

Malacostraca

Amphipoda

Crangonyctidae

Gammaridae

Niphargidae

Paramelitidae

Anaspidacea

Anaspididae

Psammaspidae

Decapoda

Astacidae

Atyidae

Cambaridae

Gecarcinucidae

Palaemonidae

Palinuridae

Parastacidae

Potamidae

Potamonautidae

Pseudothelphusidae

Trichodactylidae

Typhlocarididae

Isopoda

Armadillidae

Asellidae

Cirolanidae

Phreatoicidae

Sphaeromatidae

Stenasellidae

Trichoniscidae

Maxillopoda

Calanoida

Centropagidae

Diaptomidae

Temoridae

Cyclopoida

Cyclopidae

Harpacticoida

Ameiridae

Canthocamptidae

Darcythompsoniidae

Xiphosura

Limulina

Limulidae

Ostracoda

Myodocopida

Cypridinidae

Podocopida

Candonidae

Limnocytheridae

Notodromadidae

Chordata

Actinopterygii

Acipenseriformes

Acipenseridae

Polyodontidae

Albuliformes

Albulidae

Anguilliformes

Anguillidae

Ophichthidae

Atheriniformes

Atherinidae

Atherinopsidae

Bedotiidae

Melanotaeniidae

Phallostethidae

Pseudomugilidae

Telmatherinidae

Batrachoidiformes

Batrachoididae

Beloniformes

Adrianichthyidae

Hemiramphidae

Beryciformes

Holocentridae

Characiformes

Alestidae

Anostomidae

Bryconidae

Characidae

Distichodontidae

Prochilodontidae

Clupeiformes

Clupeidae

Denticipitidae

Engraulidae

Pristigasteridae

Cypriniformes

Balitoridae

Catostomidae

Cobitidae

Cyprinidae

Cyprinodontiformes

Aplocheilidae

Cyprinodontidae

Fundulidae

Goodeidae

Nothobranchiidae

Poeciliidae

Rivulidae

Elopiformes

Megalopidae

Esociformes

Umbridae

Gadiformes

Gadidae

Gasterosteiformes

Gasterosteidae

Indostomidae

Gobiesociformes

Gobiesocidae

Gonorynchiformes

Kneriidae

Gymnotiformes

Apteronotidae

Gymnotidae

Ophidiiformes

Bythitidae

Dinematichthyidae

Osmeriformes

Galaxiidae

Salangidae

Osteoglossiformes

Mormyridae

Perciformes

Acanthuridae

Anabantidae

Blenniidae

Callionymidae

Carangidae

Chaenopsidae

Channidae

Cheimarrichthyidae

Cichlidae

Dactyloscopidae

Datnioididae

Elassomatidae

Eleotridae

Epinephelidae

Gobiidae

Haemulidae

Istiophoridae

Kuhliidae

Kyphosidae

Labridae

Labrisomidae

Latidae

Lutjanidae

Microdesmidae

Mullidae

Nemipteridae

Osphronemidae

Percichthyidae

Percidae

Polynemidae

Pomacanthidae

Pomacentridae

Pomatomidae

Pseudochromidae

Sciaenidae

Scombridae

Serranidae

Siganidae

Sparidae

Terapontidae

Tripterygiidae

Pleuronectiformes

Pleuronectidae

Soleidae

Salmoniformes

Salmonidae

Scorpaeniformes

Cottidae

Triglidae

Siluriformes

Akysidae

Amphiliidae

Ariidae

Astroblepidae

Bagridae

Callichthyidae

Clariidae

Claroteidae

Cranoglanididae

Heptapteridae

Ictaluridae

Loricariidae

Mochokidae

Pangasiidae

Plotosidae

Siluridae

Sisoridae

Trichomycteridae

Synbranchiformes

Chaudhuriidae

Mastacembelidae

Synbranchidae

Syngnathiformes

Syngnathidae

Tetraodontiformes

Balistidae

Molidae

Monacanthidae

Tetraodontidae

Amphibia

Anura

Alsodidae

Alytidae

Aromobatidae

Arthroleptidae

Batrachylidae

Bombinatoridae

Bufonidae

Calyptocephalellidae

Centrolenidae

Ceratobatrachidae

Ceratophryidae

Ceuthomantidae

Conrauidae

Craugastoridae

Cycloramphidae

Dendrobatidae

Dicroglossidae

Eleutherodactylidae

Hemiphractidae

Hylidae

Hyperoliidae

Leiopelmatidae

Leptodactylidae

Limnodynastidae

Mantellidae

Megophryidae

Micrixalidae

Microhylidae

Myobatrachidae

Nyctibatrachidae

Odontophrynidae

Phrynobatrachidae

Pipidae

Pyxicephalidae

Ranidae

Ranixalidae

Rhacophoridae

Telmatobiidae

Caudata

Ambystomatidae

Hynobiidae

Plethodontidae

Proteidae

Rhyacotritonidae

Salamandridae

Gymnophiona

Dermophiidae

Herpelidae

Ichthyophiidae

Aves

Accipitriformes

Accipitridae

Sagittariidae

Anseriformes

Anatidae

Bucerotiformes

Bucerotidae

Caprimulgiformes

Apodidae

Caprimulgidae

Trochilidae

Charadriiformes

Alcidae

Charadriidae

Glareolidae

Laridae

Scolopacidae

Turnicidae

Ciconiiformes

Ciconiidae

Columbiformes

Columbidae

Coraciiformes

Alcedinidae

Brachypteraciidae

Momotidae

Cuculiformes

Cuculidae

Falconiformes

Falconidae

Galliformes

Cracidae

Megapodiidae

Numididae

Odontophoridae

Phasianidae

Gruiformes

Gruidae

Psophiidae

Rallidae

Mesitornithiformes

Mesitornithidae

Musophagiformes

Musophagidae

Otidiformes

Otididae

Passeriformes

Acanthizidae

Acrocephalidae

Alaudidae

Bernieridae

Calcariidae

Calyptophilidae

Campephagidae

Chloropseidae

Cinclidae

Cisticolidae

Corvidae

Cotingidae

Dicaeidae

Dicruridae

Emberizidae

Estrildidae

Eurylaimidae

Fringillidae

Furnariidae

Grallariidae

Hirundinidae

Icteridae

Laniidae

Leiothrichidae

Locustellidae

Malaconotidae

Maluridae

Meliphagidae

Mimidae

Modulatricidae

Monarchidae

Motacillidae

Muscicapidae

Nectariniidae

Notiomystidae

Oriolidae

Pachycephalidae

Paradisaeidae

Paridae

Parulidae

Passerellidae

Passeridae

Pellorneidae

Petroicidae

Phaenicophilidae

Philepittidae

Phylloscopidae

Picathartidae

Pipridae

Pittidae

Ploceidae

Pycnonotidae

Rhinocryptidae

Rhipiduridae

Sittidae

Sturnidae

Sylviidae

Thamnophilidae

Thraupidae

Timaliidae

Tityridae

Troglodytidae

Turdidae

Tyrannidae

Vangidae

Vireonidae

Zosteropidae

Pelecaniformes

Ardeidae

Balaenicipitidae

Threskiornithidae

Phoenicopteriformes

Phoenicopteridae

Piciformes

Capitonidae

Galbulidae

Lybiidae

Picidae

Ramphastidae

Podicipediformes

Podicipedidae

Procellariiformes

Diomedeidae

Hydrobatidae

Procellariidae

Psittaciformes

Cacatuidae

Psittacidae

Sphenisciformes

Spheniscidae

Strigiformes

Strigidae

Tytonidae

Struthioniformes

Apterygidae

Struthionidae

Tinamidae

Suliformes

Fregatidae

Phalacrocoracidae

Trogoniformes

Trogonidae

Cephalaspidomorphi

Petromyzontiformes

Petromyzontidae

Chondrichthyes

Carcharhiniformes

Carcharhinidae

Hemigaleidae

Pentanchidae

Scyliorhinidae

Sphyrnidae

Triakidae

Chimaeriformes

Chimaeridae

Lamniformes

Alopiidae

Cetorhinidae

Lamnidae

Odontaspididae

Myliobatiformes

Aetobatidae

Dasyatidae

Myliobatidae

Orectolobiformes

Brachaeluridae

Ginglymostomatidae

Hemiscylliidae

Rajiformes

Arhynchobatidae

Gymnuridae

Mobulidae

Narcinidae

Narkidae

Platyrhinidae

Rajidae

Rhinopteridae

Urolophidae

Urotrygonidae

Rhinopristiformes

Glaucostegidae

Rhinidae

Rhinobatidae

Trygonorrhinidae

Squaliformes

Centrophoridae

Oxynotidae

Squalidae

Squatiniformes

Squatinidae

Mammalia

Afrosoricida

Chrysochloridae

Tenrecidae

Carnivora

Eupleridae

Felidae

Herpestidae

Mephitidae

Mustelidae

Odobenidae

Otariidae

Phocidae

Ursidae

Viverridae

Cetartiodactyla

Bovidae

Cervidae

Delphinidae

Giraffidae

Hippopotamidae

Moschidae

Phocoenidae

Physeteridae

Pontoporiidae

Suidae

Tayassuidae

Chiroptera

Craseonycteridae

Emballonuridae

Furipteridae

Hipposideridae

Megadermatidae

Molossidae

Mystacinidae

Natalidae

Nycteridae

Phyllostomidae

Pteropodidae

Rhinolophidae

Vespertilionidae

Cingulata

Chlamyphoridae

Dasyuromorphia

Dasyuridae

Didelphimorphia

Didelphidae

Diprotodontia

Macropodidae

Phalangeridae

Phascolarctidae

Potoroidae

Pseudocheiridae

Eulipotyphla

Erinaceidae

Soricidae

Talpidae

Lagomorpha

Leporidae

Macroscelidea

Macroscelididae

Monotremata

Tachyglossidae

Paucituberculata

Caenolestidae

Peramelemorphia

Peramelidae

Thylacomyidae

Perissodactyla

Equidae

Rhinocerotidae

Tapiridae

Pholidota

Manidae

Pilosa

Bradypodidae

Myrmecophagidae

Primates

Aotidae

Atelidae

Callitrichidae

Cebidae

Cercopithecidae

Cheirogaleidae

Hylobatidae

Indriidae

Lemuridae

Lepilemuridae

Lorisidae

Pitheciidae

Tarsiidae

Proboscidea

Elephantidae

Rodentia

Bathyergidae

Capromyidae

Cricetidae

Ctenomyidae

Dasyproctidae

Dipodidae

Erethizontidae

Gliridae

Heteromyidae

Hystricidae

Muridae

Nesomyidae

Octodontidae

Platacanthomyidae

Sciuridae

Spalacidae

Scandentia

Tupaiidae

Sirenia

Dugongidae

Trichechidae

Myxini

Myxiniformes

Myxinidae

Reptilia

Crocodylia

Crocodylidae

Rhynchocephalia

Sphenodontidae

Squamata

Agamidae

Amphisbaenidae

Anguidae

Boidae

Calamariidae

Carphodactylidae

Chamaeleonidae

Colubridae

Cordylidae

Crotaphytidae

Dactyloidae

Diplodactylidae

Dipsadidae

Elapidae

Eublepharidae

Gekkonidae

Gerrhosauridae

Gymnophthalmidae

Homalopsidae

Hoplocercidae

Iguanidae

Lacertidae

Lamprophiidae

Leiosauridae

Liolaemidae

Natricidae

Phrynosomatidae

Phyllodactylidae

Polychrotidae

Psammophiidae

Pseudoxyrhophiidae

Pygopodidae

Pythonidae

Scincidae

Sphaerodactylidae

Teiidae

Tropidophiidae

Tropiduridae

Typhlopidae

Uropeltidae

Varanidae

Viperidae

Xantusiidae

Xenodermatidae

Xenosauridae

Testudines

Carettochelyidae

Chelidae

Cheloniidae

Chelydridae

Dermochelyidae

Emydidae

Geoemydidae

Kinosternidae

Pelomedusidae

Podocnemididae

Testudinidae

Trionychidae

Sarcopterygii

Coelacanthiformes

Latimeriidae

Cnidaria

Anthozoa

Actinaria

Edwardsiidae

Alcyonacea

Plexauridae

Helioporacea

Helioporidae

Scleractinia

Acroporidae

Agariciidae

Astrocoeniidae

Caryophylliidae

Dendrophylliidae

Euphylliidae

Faviidae

Fungiidae

Meandrinidae

Mussidae

Oculinidae

Pectiniidae

Pocilloporidae

Poritidae

Siderastreidae

Hydrozoa

Milleporina

Milleporidae

Echinodermata

Holothuroidea

Aspidochirotida

Holothuriidae

Stichopodidae

Mollusca

Bivalvia

Arcida

Arcidae

Cardiida

Cardiidae

Unionida

Hyriidae

Iridinidae

Margaritiferidae

Mycetopodidae

Unionidae

Venerida

Dreissenidae

Sphaeriidae

Cephalopoda

Octopoda

Opisthoteuthidae

Gastropoda

Allogastropoda

Glacidorbidae

Valvatidae

Architaenioglossa

Aciculidae

Ampullariidae

Craspedopomatidae

Cyclophoridae

Diplommatinidae

Megalomastomatidae

Neocyclotidae

Pupinidae

Viviparidae

Cycloneritimorpha

Hydrocenidae

Neritidae

Eupulmonata

Ellobiidae

Hygrophila

Acroloxidae

Chilinidae

Lymnaeidae

Physidae

Planorbidae

Littorinimorpha

Amnicolidae

Assimineidae

Bithyniidae

Cochliopidae

Hydrobiidae

Lithoglyphidae

Littorinidae

Moitessieriidae

Pomatiopsidae

Stenothyridae

Neogastropoda

Conidae

Sorbeoconcha

Melanopsidae

Pachychilidae

Paludomidae

Pleuroceridae

Thiaridae

Stylommatophora

Acavidae

Achatinellidae

Achatinidae

Agriolimacidae

Argnidae

Arionidae

Ariophantidae

Camaenidae

Cerastidae

Charopidae

Chlamydephoridae

Chondrinidae

Clausiliidae

Cochlicellidae

Cochlicopidae

Discidae

Endodontidae

Enidae

Euconulidae

Ferussaciidae

Gastrodontidae

Helicarionidae

Helicidae

Helicodontidae

Helminthoglyptidae

Hygromiidae

Lauriidae

Limacidae

Megomphicidae

Milacidae

Orculidae

Oreohelicidae

Orthalicidae

Oxychilidae

Papillodermatidae

Parmacellidae

Partulidae

Polygyridae

Pristilomatidae

Punctidae

Pupillidae

Rhytididae

Spelaeodiscidae

Streptaxidae

Strophocheilidae

Succineidae

Trissexodontidae

Trochomorphidae

Urocyclidae

Vertiginidae

Vitrinidae

Zonitidae

Nemertina

Enopla

Hoplonemertea

Prosorhochmidae

Onychophora

Onychophora

Onychophora

Peripatopsidae

External links
</ref>

Animalia